The Cobbett Association for Chamber Music Research was founded in 1990, with the objective of disseminating information about lesser known chamber music of merit. It was named after Walter Willson Cobbett, an amateur violinist and author/editor of Cobbett's Cyclopedic Survey of Chamber Music. During its existence, the Association published a periodical, The Chamber Music Journal, under the general editorship of R.H.R. Silvertrust, which was dedicated to presenting information about the chamber music of lesser known composers. The Association ceased operations in 2010.

External links
The Cobbett Association
The Chamber Music Journal

Chamber music
Music organizations based in the United States
1990 establishments in the United States
2010 disestablishments in Illinois